is a syllable in Javanese script that represents the sound /dʒɔ/, /dʒa/. It is transliterated to Latin as "ja" or "ya", and sometimes in Indonesian orthography as "jo" or "yo".

Pasangan 
Its pasangan form , is located on the bottom side of the previous syllable. For example,  - anak jaran (little horse).

Extended form 
The letter ꦗ doesn't have a murda form.

Using cecak telu, the syllable represents /z/.

ꦗ with a cerek (ꦘ) is called Nya murda.

Mahaprana
Mahaprana letters were originally aspirated consonants used in Sanskrit and Kawi transliterations. However, there are no aspirated consonants in modern Javanese. 

Glyphs

Unicode block 

Javanese script was added to the Unicode Standard in October, 2009 with the release of version 5.2.

See also
 Ja (Indic), a general overview encompassing other Indic scripts

References 

Javanese script